The Heinkel He 113 was a fictitious German fighter aircraft of World War II, invented as a propaganda and possibly disinformation exercise.

Development 
In 1940, Nazi Minister of Propaganda Joseph Goebbels publicised the fact that a new fighter was entering service with the Luftwaffe. The plan involved taking pictures of Heinkel He 100 D-1s at different air bases around Germany, each time sporting a new paint job for various fictional fighter groups. The pictures were then published in the press with the He 113 name, sometimes billed as night fighters (despite lacking even a landing light).

The aircraft also appeared in a series of "action shot" photographs in various magazines such as Der Adler, including claims that it had proven itself in combat in Denmark and Norway. One source claims that the aircraft were on loan to the one Luftwaffe Staffel in Norway for a time, but this might be a case of the same misinformation working many years later.

It is unclear even today exactly whom this effort was intended to impress—foreign air forces or Germany's public—but it seems to have been a successful deception. British intelligence featured the aircraft in AIR 40/237, a report on the Luftwaffe that was completed in 1940. There the top speed was listed as 628 km/h (390 mph). It also states the wing was 15.5 m2 (167 ft²) and it noted that the aircraft was in production. Reports of 113s encountered and shot down were listed throughout the early years of the war.

Specifications (He 100D-1 {He 113})

References

Further reading
 
 
 
 
 
 

Fictional aircraft
He 113
World War II fighter aircraft of Germany
Disinformation operations